The Digital Film Academy (DFA) is a for-profit art and design college with locations in Manhattan, New York and Atlanta, Georgia, founded in 2001.

History
DFA was established in 2001 by filmmaker Patrick DiRenna in the historic Film Center Building in Manhattan. DiRenna was inspired by the evolution of digital cameras which he saw as a democratization of filmmaking. Digital Film Academy offers 16 month Associate Degrees in digital filmmaking, as well as one year long (12 month) conservatory programs both open to beginner and advanced level students. In April 2020, a new branch was opened in the downtown area of Atlanta, Georgia.

As of 2018, the school has over 200 students every year which includes both American students and international students. (International students can apply for Curricular Practical Training, Optional Practical Training and STEM OPT, thus granting them up to 4 years of work authorization in the USA). The school is also authorized to enroll veterans as students under the GI Bill. DFA was also named as Best Film School in NYC by Village Voice.

Admission
Admission is rolling, with new programs opening three times a year in Fall, Spring, and Summer terms.

Curriculum
DFA offers both full-time and part-time programs. In response to the Coronavirus pandemic, in March 2020 the school switched to an online remote delivery method to prevent any interruption to the student learning experience. The institute offers One Year and Advanced Year Certificate programs in Digital Filmmaking, as well as a 16 month Associate Degree in Digital Media. The core classes include screenwriting, directing, cinematography, sound recording, production management (see Unit production manager), pre-production, video editing, sound editing & design and applied post production. The elective classes include After Effects (motion graphics and visual effects), Maya 3d animation, Web TV production, D.I.T. (Digital Imaging Technician), Documentary film, color correction, steadicam.

Notable alumni
Chadwick Boseman, actor
Alex Felix Bendaña, Screenwriter of The Gateway distributed by Lionsgate whose script was included in the 2013 The Black List
Phuttiphong Aroonpheng, Director of Manta Ray (film), Venice Film Festival winner 2018
Brad Bailey, Student Oscar winner 2017 for documentary 'Hale' 

Jamal Solomon, Director of Photography of movie 'Angelfish' starring Princess Nokia

Ranvir Shorey, Indian actor known for classic movies like Mithya(a Black Comedy), Titli and Sonchiriya.

References

External links
 

For-profit universities and colleges in the United States
Art schools in New York City
Universities and colleges in New York City
Universities and colleges in Manhattan
2001 establishments in New York City
Private universities and colleges in New York (state)
Film schools in New York (state)
Private universities and colleges in Georgia (U.S. state)
Art schools in Georgia (U.S. state)
Film schools in the United States